Kunal Goswami is an Indian actor and business person who acted in films and television. He is the son of Indian film star and producer-director Manoj Kumar.

Biography
Goswami made his debut in Bollywood with his father's 1981 film Kranti. He played his first leading role in the 1983 films Ghungroo and Kalakaar. In Kalakaar Sridevi was his co-star and the hit song Neele Neele Ambar Par was picturized on him. He starred in several other films such as Do Gulab (1983), Ricky (1986), Aakhri Baazi (1989) and Paap Ki Kamaee (1990). After the release of Numbri Aadmi and Vishkanya in 1991, he took a hiatus from acting for several years. He tried to revive his career once more in the 1999 film Jai Hind which was directed by his father. None of his films were a success and he quit films after 1999.

In 2000, Goswami also acted in the television serial Alag Alag which was aired on DD National.

Personal life
He has an older brother named Vishal. His uncle is actor Rajiv Goswami. In 2005 he married Ritu Goswami. He is now running a catering business in Delhi.

Filmography

Films

Television

References

External links
 

Living people
Indian male child actors
Male actors in Hindi cinema
Indian male film actors
Male actors in Hindi television
Indian male television actors
Businesspeople from Delhi
1961 births
Bharatiya Janata Party politicians from Maharashtra